Greece recognizes same-sex cohabitation agreements, which provide several of the rights and benefits of marriage. Legislation allowing such unions was approved by the Hellenic Parliament on 23 December 2015 and published in the Government Gazette the following day.
In 2022, the opposition SYRIZA party submitted a bill for same-sex marriage and adoption.

Cohabitation agreements

Introduction of cohabitation agreements for opposite-sex couples
The Government of Greece under Prime Minister Kostas Karamanlis, which governed until October 2009, was opposed to same-sex marriage. The New Democracy-led government had proposed legislation that would offer several rights to unmarried couples, but only to opposite-sex couples. If introduced, the law was expected to be declared unconstitutional or against EU principles if brought to Greek or European courts.

The Panhellenic Socialist Movement (PASOK) under George Papandreou, then in opposition, presented in April 2006 a legislative proposal for the recognition of unmarried couples, same-sex and opposite-sex, following the French example of the civil solidarity pact. However, according to some LGBT groups, the proposal's controversial terminology made little headway on LGBT rights and PASOK's proposed partnership law banned same-sex couples from adopting. In November 2008, PASOK once again submitted a draft law on cohabitation agreements, but it made no progress in the Parliament.

Responding to government proposals in 2008 to introduce legal rights for cohabiting couples, Archbishop Ieronymos II of Athens, primate of the Church of Greece, suggested that "[t]here is a need to change with the time". It is unclear, however, whether this view applied to same-sex couples, particularly as the Church has previously opposed LGBT rights in general and civil union laws in particular.

Law 3719/2008 ("Reforms concerning the family, children and society"), which entered into force on 26 November 2008, established a form of partnership known as "cohabitation agreements", but only available to opposite-sex couples.

Extension of cohabitation agreements to same-sex couples

Before the October 2009 legislative election, the Panhellenic Socialist Movement (PASOK) announced its support for same-sex registered partnerships in a reply to a questionnaire sent by the gay rights group OLKE. PASOK ended up winning the election. On 17 September 2010, Minister of Justice Haris Kastanidis announced that a special committee had been formed to prepare a registered partnership law that would include both same-sex and different-sex couples. The committee was constituted on 29 July 2010 and, according to its members, its work was to make proposals regarding the modernization of family law. It discussed matters regarding heterosexual couples until the end of 2010, and matters regarding same-sex couples from January 2011 onwards. On 19 August 2011, a government official announced that legislation recognizing same-sex relationships would be introduced soon. In February 2013, Minister of Justice Antonis Roupakiotis said that the government was considering amending the cohabitation agreement law to include same-sex couples.

On 8 February 2011, the European Court of Human Rights (ECHR) decided to merge and accept two cases from four couples regarding a breach of article 8 (respect of private and family life), article 14 (freedom from discrimination) and article 13 (effective remedy) of the European Convention on Human Rights. The cases were brought to the ECHR as a result of the Greek state introducing cohabitation agreement legislation that specifically and expressly excluded same-sex couples. On 7 November 2013, the ECHR ruled in Vallianatos and Others v. Greece that excluding same-sex couples from cohabitation agreements is discriminatory. On 12 November, PASOK announced its intention to introduce a bill extending the cohabitation agreement law to same-sex couples.

In November 2014, it was announced that many major changes to Greek family law would be considered, the most prominent being the extension of cohabitation agreements to same-sex couples. It was also reported that the Ministry of Justice was not considering same-sex marriage.

Legislation by the government of SYRIZA
On 9 February 2015, following the January 2015 legislative election, the Syriza-led government, sworn in on 27 January 2015, promised to extend cohabitation agreements to same-sex couples. On 24 April 2015, the Secretary General of the Ministry of Justice announced the government's intention to bring a bill before the Hellenic Parliament within two months. Shortly thereafter, a committee was formed to study the issue until 15 June 2015. The bill was published on 10 June 2015.

On 9 November 2015, a new draft of the cohabitation agreement bill granting some of the rights of marriage was published. The bill was under public consultation until 20 November. Justice Minister Nikos Paraskevopoulos announced that the legislation would not cover adoption rights, and that the issue would be studied in the future. The bill was submitted to Parliament on 9 December, and approved on 23 December 2015 by a vote of 194–55 with 51 abstentions, following a contentious debate that lasted ten hours. The bill was supported by the governing leftist party Syriza, the Democratic Alignment, the River, and the Union of Centrists but opposed by the Communist Party of Greece, the national-conservative Independent Greeks, and the far-right party Golden Dawn, while the liberal-conservative New Democracy was divided. The law was signed by President Prokopis Pavlopoulos, and published in the Government Gazette on 24 December 2015. It took effect upon publication. The first same-sex cohabitation agreement was conducted in Athens on 25 January 2016 by Mayor Giorgos Kaminis.

On 9 November 2016, the government submitted a draft bill equalizing cohabitation agreements with marriages in several areas including employment benefits and workers' rights. The bill was approved by Parliament on 2 December in a 201–21 vote. It was signed into law by President Pavlopoulos on 8 December 2016 and took effect upon publication in the official journal the following day.

Statistics
According to the Hellenic Statistical Authority, the number of cohabitation agreements performed per year is as follows:

Same-sex marriage

First marriages in Tilos
In 2008, the gay rights group OLKE announced its intention to sue Greek municipalities that refuse to marry same-sex couples, pointing out a loophole in the 1982 law that legalized civil marriage between "persons", without reference to gender.

On 3 June 2008, the Mayor of Tilos, Anastasios Aliferis, married two same-sex couples, two lesbians and two gay men, citing the legal loophole. He was heavily criticized by clergymen of the Church of Greece, which in the past had also opposed the introduction of heterosexual civil marriage, the original intent of the 1982 law. Justice Minister Sotirios Hatzigakis declared the Tilos marriages "invalid" and Supreme Court prosecutor Georgios Sanidas warned Mayor Aliferis of the legal repercussions of his "breach of duty", but he said he had "no intention of annulling the marriages". Government officials filed a court motion to annul the two same-sex marriages, stirring demonstrations and protests among the LGBT community.

On 5 May 2009, the court of first instance of Rhodes ruled that the marriages were invalid, but the couples appealed the ruling. A hearing on the case by the Court of Appeal of Dodecanese was held on 14 January 2011. The court issued a decision invaliding both marriages on 14 April 2011. On 30 November 2017, this ruling was upheld by the Supreme Court. The couples have announced their intention to sue Greece with the European Court of Human Rights.

2019 elections
On 10 June 2019, Prime Minister Alexis Tsipras said that same-sex marriage would be legalized if his party, Syriza, won the parliamentary election held on 7 July 2019. However, his party was not re-elected.

Public opinion
A May 2015 Focus Bari poll found that 70% of Greeks agreed that civil partnerships should be extended to same-sex couples. The same poll also found majority support for same-sex marriage, with 56% in favor and 35% opposed.

A poll conducted by DiaNEOsis in December 2016 showed that 50% of Greeks supported same-sex marriage and 26% were in favor of adoption by same-sex couples.

The 2019 Eurobarometer found that 39% of Greeks thought same-sex marriage should be allowed throughout Europe, while 56% were opposed. The same poll found that 64% of respondents agreed with the statement: "Gay, lesbian and bisexual people should have the same rights as heterosexual people", whereas 32% disagreed. Those figures marked an increase of 6% and 2%, respectively, compared to the 2015 Eurobarometer survey.

A 2020 poll conducted by the Friedrich Naumann Foundation in cooperation with KAPA Research found that same-sex marriage was supported by 56% of the respondents, while adoption by same-sex couples was supported by 40%.

See also
LGBT rights in Greece
Recognition of same-sex unions in Europe
Same-sex union court cases

References

LGBT rights in Greece
Greece
Marriage, unions and partnerships in Greece